Ahmed Al-Assiri, Ahmed al-Assiri or Ahmed Assiri may refer to:
 Ahmed al-Assiri (general) (born 1952), Saudi general and main suspect in the killing of Jamal Khashoggi
 Ahmed Al-Assiri (sprinter) (born 1952), Saudi sprinter
 Ahmed al-Assir (born 1968), Lebanese Islamist cleric and a participant in the Syrian Civil War
 Ahmed Assiri (footballer, born 1988), Saudi footballer
 Ahmed Assiri (footballer, born 1991), Saudi footballer